Richard Long may refer to:

English political figures
Richard Long (MP for Old Sarum), see Old Sarum (UK Parliament constituency)
Richard Long (courtier) (c. 1494–1546), Gentleman of the Privy Chamber to Henry VIII; knighted in 1537; MP for Southwark (1539)
Richard Long (died 1730) (1668–1730), Whig MP for Chippenham, Wiltshire; supporter of the Immorality Bill; sheriff of Wiltshire (1702–03) 
Richard Long (died 1760) (c. 1691–1760), member of the Long family of Wiltshire; first son of the above; Tory MP for Chippenham 
Richard Godolphin Long (1761–1835), another member of the Long family; grandson of the above; MP for Wiltshire (1806–18)
Richard Penruddocke Long (1825–1875), further member of the Long family; MP for Chippenham (1859–65) and North Wiltshire (1865–68)
Richard Long, 3rd Viscount Long (1892–1967), later member of Wiltshire's Long family; Conservative MP for Westbury (1927–31)
Richard Long, 4th Viscount Long (1929–2017), contemporary member of the family; second son of the above; Conservative peer.

Others
Richard Long (actor) (1927–1974), American performer best known for the TV series The Big Valley and Nanny and the Professor
Richard Long (artist) (born 1945), English sculptor, photographer and painter who, after four nominations, won the Turner Prize in 1989
Richard Long (broadcaster) (born c. 1955), New Zealand newsreader who achieved high popularity during a 17-year TV career (1987–2003)
Richard Long (journalist) (born c. 1940), New Zealand journalist, former editor of The Dominion
Richard A. Long (1927–2013), African-American historian
Rikard Long (1889–1977) Faroese teacher, writer and politician
Dick Long (1924–2021), Australian politician

See also
Long (surname)